Rubeus Hagrid is a fictional character in the Harry Potter book series written by J. K. Rowling. He is introduced in Harry Potter and the Philosopher's Stone as a half-giant and half-human who is the gamekeeper and Keeper of Keys and Grounds of Hogwarts, the primary setting for the first six novels. In the third novel Harry Potter and the Prisoner of Azkaban, Hagrid is promoted to Care of Magical Creatures professor, and is later revealed to be a member of the Order of the Phoenix. A loyal, friendly, softhearted personality who is easily brought to tears, he is also known for his thick West Country accent.

Hagrid was portrayed by Robbie Coltrane in all eight Harry Potter films, from Philosopher's Stone in 2001 to Deathly Hallows – Part 2 in 2011.

Character development
Hagrid was among the characters that Rowling says she created on "the very first day". She has explained the source of his name as "another old English word, meaning – if you were hagrid – it’s a dialect word – you’d had a bad night. Hagrid is a big drinker – he has a lot of bad nights." His first name, Rubeus, was named after red in Latin to reflect alchemy and his paternal contrast to Albus Dumbledore: his "passion" to Dumbledore's "asceticism". In her article "Harry’s Fame", Rosemary Goring notes the Forest of Dean is an influence on Rowling’s work, and Hagrid is the only character that is "directly drawn from the Forest of Dean". According to Goring, Hagrid’s "dropped word-endings are a Chepstow speciality." She also claims that Hagrid is physically "modeled on the Welsh chapter of Hells Angels who’d swoop down on the town and hog the bar, 'huge mountains of leather and hair".

The character of Hagrid and conversations between him, Harry Potter, Ron Weasley and Hermione Granger in his hut are expository through the series, due to the fact that the trio frequently discover things about Albus Dumbledore and Hogwarts by talking with Hagrid, as he has a habit of letting slip bits of information that were specifically confided to him. He was also one of the first characters to imply that the idea of thinking of wizards as "pure-bloods" and "half-bloods" is a dated concept.

Rowling has stated in an interview that Hagrid was in Gryffindor house during his time as a student. When he comes into possession of an acromantula, he is expelled from Hogwarts as his pet is believed to be the "monster of Slytherin". However, persuaded by Dumbledore (who at the time was Transfiguration teacher), Headmaster Armando Dippet agrees to train Hagrid as gamekeeper, allowing the boy to remain at Hogwarts. By the time Harry attends Hogwarts, Hagrid is also the Keeper of Keys and Grounds: the former, according to Rowling, means "that he will let you in and out of Hogwarts." Part of his job includes leading the first years across the lake in boats, upon their initial arrival at Hogwarts.

When discussing the killing off of characters in her books, Rowling said that she always knew she was "working towards the point where Hagrid carried Harry out alive – but supposedly dead – out of the forest". She said she had planned from very early on that Harry would walk to his death accompanied by the 'ghosts', and that "he would emerge in Hagrid's arms". In her own words, "that's what always kept Hagrid safe". She said "Hagrid would have been a natural to kill in some ways", but that the mental image of this moment – a big fatherly Hagrid carrying the limp Harry in his arms – was so strong it decided his fate. She also liked the circular notion of Hagrid both bringing Harry into the world, and then bringing him back from the dead.

Appearances

Harry Potter and the Philosopher's Stone

Hagrid is introduced in the opening chapter of the first novel. Following the death of James and Lily Potter, Dumbledore entrusts Hagrid with rescuing the infant Harry from his parents' house after they have been murdered by Lord Voldemort. When Minerva McGonagall expresses her concern about the fact that it was Hagrid who would carry Harry to the Dursleys', Dumbledore says that he would trust Hagrid with his life, a fact that is demonstrated several times during the series, as Dumbledore frequently asks him to carry out secret tasks. Ten years later, he is tasked to bring the Philosopher’s Stone from Gringotts to Hogwarts, and provides the three-headed dog Fluffy to guard it. Dumbledore also gives him the task of locating Harry, helping him to find his bearings in the wizarding world and to buy his school things. Hagrid is the first member of the Hogwarts staff to be introduced to Harry before he began attending the school. Hagrid later becomes friends with Ron and Hermione as well. Later in the book, a hooded person (Quirinus Quirrell in disguise) gives him a dragon egg to elicit details about Fluffy. Hagrid lets slip to Harry, Ron, and Hermione that the way to get past Fluffy is to play music, for which they use the flute Hagrid himself carved for Harry, which allows them to pursue the potential thief. The three also assist Hagrid after the dragon egg hatches, by helping to remove the baby dragon Norbert, who is taken to live in a dragon sanctuary in Romania where Ron’s older brother, Charlie Weasley, works.

Harry Potter and the Chamber of Secrets
Readers first discover why Hagrid was expelled from Hogwarts in the second novel. It is revealed that Hagrid was a student at Hogwarts at the same time as Tom Marvolo Riddle, the wizard who later became Lord Voldemort. Hagrid was expelled during his third year, after being caught in the company of Aragog, a dangerous acromantula: this already serious crime seemed worse than it was, due to the belief that the acromantula was “The Monster of Slytherin”, and that Hagrid had released it from the Chamber of Secrets and allowed it to attack students. Aragog escapes into the dark forest and starts a colony of spiders. The belief of Hagrid's guilt was encouraged by Tom Riddle, the actual criminal, who had been using the true monster (a basilisk) to attack students, and who had framed Hagrid to prevent the school from being closed, because he didn't want to return to the orphanage whence he had come. During the events of the second book, the Basilisk is unleashed once again and Hagrid is sent to the prison of Azkaban, as he is believed again to be responsible for the attacks. However, before being arrested, Hagrid tells Harry and Ron to "follow the spiders", so that they can meet Aragog and discover the identity of the true monster. After Harry defeats the Basilisk in the Chamber of Secrets and uncovers the truth, Hagrid is freed from prison.

Harry Potter and the Prisoner of Azkaban

Following the resignation of Silvanus Kettleburn, who, according to Dumbledore, wanted to spend time with his remaining limbs, Hagrid is assigned to teach the subject of Care of Magical Creatures in the third novel. He is also allowed to perform magic again since his name has been cleared after the events of the previous book. During his first class, in which he introduces the hippogriffs to third-years, one of the beasts, Buckbeak, attacks Draco Malfoy after the boy insults it. Although Dumbledore manages to prove that Hagrid is innocent, the Ministry of Magic sentences Buckbeak to death. Thus, Hagrid's classes become extremely boring, and Harry, Ron, and Hermione spend some time looking for information that would help Hagrid in Buckbeak’s defence. Near the end of the book Hermione and Harry use a time-turner to save Buckbeak from death and Sirius Black from the Dementor's Kiss.

Harry Potter and the Goblet of Fire
In the fourth novel it is revealed that Hagrid is of mixed wizard and giant parentage, his mother having been the giantess Fridwulfa, who left his wizard father when Hagrid was a baby. Since giants have a reputation for being brutal, and were once allies of Voldemort, Hagrid keeps his parentage a secret and allows people to imagine other reasons for his great size (such as drinking a bottle of Skele-Gro when he did not need it). Hagrid’s parentage is exposed in the Daily Prophet by Rita Skeeter, who portrays him as dangerous (because of his fascination for aggressive creatures) and incompetent. Hagrid is gravely affected by this and attempts to resign from his post as teacher, though Dumbledore does not accept his resignation. During the novel, Hagrid develops a romantic interest with Olympe Maxime – another half-giant witch and Headmistress of the French magic school Beauxbatons. Hagrid is also one of the very few people who, since the beginning, believes Harry’s word that he did not apply to enter the Triwizard Tournament. Later in the book, Alastor Moody (impersonated by Barty Crouch Jr) suggests Hagrid should show Harry that the first task of the Tournament would involve dragons. Hagrid also provides Blast-Ended Skrewts for the third task.

Harry Potter and the Order of the Phoenix
Hagrid is absent during the first part of the fifth novel. The character later reveals to Harry, Ron and Hermione that he and Madame Maxime travelled across Europe together on a mission from the Order, planning to find giants and convince them to ally themselves with the good side and with Dumbledore; however, Death Eaters also found the giants and managed to get them to Voldemort’s side. Hagrid is attacked by giants during the mission, and saved by Maxime. Hagrid and Maxime eventually part on the journey home because of Maxime’s exasperation with Grawp, Hagrid’s half-brother whom he had found and was attempting to bring home with them. Grawp, who wanted to stay with the giants, seriously injured Hagrid. Hagrid introduces his half-brother to Harry and Hermione, and asks them to take care of him after he leaves Hogwarts. High Inquisitor of Hogwarts Dolores Umbridge supervises the classes of all the members of the Hogwarts staff, including Hagrid's, and she looks for an excuse to fire him, as Hagrid is close to Dumbledore and part giant, Umbridge being highly prejudiced against non-humans. Towards the end of the book, Umbridge and other Ministry officials attempt to arrest Hagrid. The latter manages to escape, but Professor McGonagall is injured whilst trying to defend him. Finally, with Dumbledore’s post as Headmaster restored, Hagrid returns to Hogwarts.

Harry Potter and the Half-Blood Prince
In the sixth novel, Harry, Ron, and Hermione are no longer students of Care of Magical Creatures, and Hagrid is both angry and disappointed with them during the first part of the book, but he soon realises that it is not because they do not like him. Later in the novel, Aragog dies, and Hagrid risks his life to recover the Acromantula's body to give it a proper funeral. After the funeral, he and Horace Slughorn drink excessive amounts of Firewhisky, and Harry takes advantage of this situation (under the influence of Felix Felicis potion, otherwise known as "liquid luck") to retrieve a certain memory from Slughorn. Towards the end of the book, Death Eaters attack Hogwarts and Hagrid's hut is set on fire as he tries to fight them.  During Dumbledore’s funeral, Hagrid is seen carrying the Headmaster’s body.

Harry Potter and the Deathly Hallows
In the seventh novel, Hagrid is part of the Order of the Phoenix delegation assigned to remove Harry from the Dursleys' home to the magic-protected Burrow. Hagrid takes Harry on the flying motorcycle he inherited from Sirius but the plan goes awry when the Order delegation is ambushed by Death Eaters. The pair narrowly make it to the Burrow after being attacked by Voldemort himself. After attending Bill Weasley and Fleur Delacour's wedding reception, Hagrid does not appear again until near the end of the book when it is revealed he has been driven into hiding in the mountains by the new Death Eater regime at Hogwarts.

During the climactic battle, Hagrid attempts to come to the defence of Aragog's carnivorous children, who have been driven out of the Forbidden Forest by the Death Eaters and are now attacking both Hogwarts defenders and Death Eaters indiscriminately, but he is carried off by a swarm of them. He later turns up, captive in the Death Eaters' camp, when Harry sacrifices himself to Voldemort. Hagrid is forced to carry Harry back to the school, not realising that Harry has survived again, and en route accuses the watching Centaurs of not doing enough to help. The Centaurs soon afterward join the fray and Hagrid takes part in the second half of the battle, felling his main nemesis among the Death Eaters, the magical-creature executioner Walden Macnair.

According to Rowling, the scene in the final book in which Hagrid is seen carrying Harry’s apparently dead body is very significant as "Hagrid brings Harry from the Dursleys. He takes him into the wizarding world ... He was sort of his guardian and his guide ... And now I wanted Hagrid to be the one to lead Harry out of the forest." Rowling also commented that Hagrid was never in danger of dying, as she "always had that picture in my head of the huge gigantic Hagrid walking through the forest crying with Harry in his arms".

Epilogue
Nineteen years after Voldemort’s defeat, Hagrid is still at Hogwarts and invites Harry and Ginny Weasley's second son Albus Severus Potter to his hut for tea, just as he had once done for Harry himself, implying that he and Harry are still close. During an interview in 2007, when asked if Hagrid did marry, Rowling answered that Hagrid developed a relationship with a giantess but it did not work out.

Film portrayal

Scottish actor Robbie Coltrane has portrayed Hagrid in all of the film adaptations of the Harry Potter novels. Robin Williams was interested for the role and approached Chris Columbus, the director of the first two films, about participating in the project but Columbus rejected him due to the "all-British and Irish cast" policy. Rowling had wanted Coltrane for the role from the start, responding "RobbieColtraneforHagrid" all in one quick breath when asked who was the top of her list of casting choices. Coltrane was already a fan of the books and has commented that being part of the Harry Potter franchise was "a fantastic thing". Rowling discussed Hagrid's past and future with Coltrane, assisting him in preparing for the role. She also stated that "Robbie is just perfect for Hagrid because Hagrid is a very loveable character, quite likeable, quite comic [...] but he had to have – you really do have to sense – a certain toughness underneath [...] and I think Robbie does that perfectly."

Former English rugby union player Martin Bayfield portrayed Hagrid as a stunt performer in longer shots due to his large size to emphasise Hagrid’s height. Bayfield also appeared as a young Hagrid in Harry Potter and the Chamber of Secrets.

English actor Greg Draven portrayed Hagrid as an acting double in rollercoaster Hagrid's Magical Creatures Motorbike Adventure pre-show. Draven's performance was required due to Coltrane's poor health at the time of filming.

Characterisation

Outward appearance
In Philosopher’s Stone, Hagrid is mentioned as being twice as tall as the average man and nearly five times as wide but in the film, he is portrayed as being  and in later books he is said to be three times as wide. Hagrid is known for his thick West Country accent. Being a half-giant, he is less vulnerable to jinxes and spells than full-humans. In Order of the Phoenix, when Umbridge and some other wizards come to remove him from Hogwarts he fights back. They try to jinx and stun him, but the spells just bounce off him because of giant-inherited resistance to magic. Hagrid also shows this resilience at the end of Half-Blood Prince, during the chapter Flight of the Prince, withstanding a Death Eater’s powerful curses. Some potions are also ineffective with him, such as Polyjuice Potion, which is designed for human-only use.

Personality
He has a friendly, softhearted personality and is easily driven to tears, as seen in his very first scene, when he drops Harry off at the Dursleys' in Philosopher’s Stone. He is very loyal to his peers, especially Dumbledore, to whom he refers as the greatest wizard in the world multiple times. As first seen in Philosopher’s Stone, he becomes extremely angry whenever anyone insults Dumbledore around him (a mistake made by Vernon Dursley, who called Dumbledore a "crackpot old fool"). He is also very loyal to Harry, suffered several times during the series because of this loyalty, and had to go into hiding twice to avoid prison. Rowling says of Hagrid, "Hagrid was always supposed to be this almost elemental force. He’s like the king of the forest, or the Green Man. He’s this semi-wild person who lives on the edge of the forest".

Magical abilities and skills
Following his expulsion from Hogwarts, the Ministry of Magic broke Hagrid’s oak wand and forbade him to perform magic. Hagrid keeps the pieces of his wand in a pink umbrella, and performs small spells from time to time; however, he was technically forbidden to do magic until the third book, and since he is not a fully qualified wizard, he "will always be a bit inept" as compared to other adult wizards, but "occasionally surprises everyone, himself included, by bringing off more impressive bits of magic". However, he is unable to produce a Patronus. He also has magical abilities that stem from his giant blood. For example, in Harry Potter and the Order of the Phoenix, many of the stunning spells thrown at him by Ministry officials simply bounce off him. Also, being half-giant gives Hagrid some level of superhuman strength, which allowed him to bend the barrel of a shotgun with one hand.

Family

Grawp
Grawp is the giant half-brother of Hagrid. Grawp and Hagrid were born of the same mother, the giantess Fridwulfa. His knuckles are the size of cricket balls (~ in circumference). The other giants were bullying Grawp because of his diminutive size, and this is a factor in Hagrid’s decision to bring him to the Forbidden Forest. Big and dim, he only knows a few words in English and his manners are wild and unpredictable, but he is also a child in giant years. In the film, this is elaborated on more as he is visibly portrayed as a big, excitable child who simply doesn't know his own strength or developed proper social cues yet. He responds to Hermione, who approaches him like a strict but caring mother figure, scolding him when doing something wrong, but giving him praise and playing with him when he does something good.

At first, Grawp seems indifferent to his brother’s attempts to civilise him, preferring to spend his time tearing down trees. After Hagrid leaves Hogwarts to avoid being imprisoned, he leaves Grawp in the care of Harry, Ron, and Hermione. Much to their surprise, when they find themselves trapped in the forest during a confrontation with the local centaur population, Grawp inadvertently manages to divert the centaurs' attention from Harry and Hermione while looking for Hagrid, whom he calls 'Hagger'.

In the Half-Blood Prince, Grawp is moved to the mountains, where he is apparently progressing much better. He also attends Dumbledore’s funeral with Hagrid, much more civil and calm than before, and dressed formally. He also appears to understand emotions, at least to some extent, as he pats Hagrid’s head to comfort him.

In Harry Potter and the Deathly Hallows, Grawp, Hagrid, and Fang go into hiding after Hagrid throws a "Support Harry Potter" party and it is implied that Grawp helped them all escape. He is the only giant fighting on the good wizards' side in the Battle of Hogwarts, probably in an attempt to protect Hagrid, as he frequently calls his name while fighting the giants on the Death Eaters' side. Grawp participates in the victory celebration over Voldemort's defeat (albeit from a window, since he is too big to fit into the hall), and the Hogwarts students show their appreciation by tossing food into his laughing mouth.

In the film adaptation of the fifth book Grawp is computer-generated using a new "soul capturing" process from Image Metrics. Andrew Whitehead spent 18 months working on the giant Grawp for the film. Grawp is voiced and motion-captured by Tony Maudsley.

Parents
In the Goblet of Fire, the truth about Hagrid’s parents is revealed: his father, who is never named in the stories, married a giantess, Fridwulfa. Fridwulfa left Rubeus to his father’s care after his birth; according to Hagrid, she was not very maternal. Later she gave birth to Grawp. She died long before Hagrid returned to the giants in the Order of the Phoenix. Hagrid describes his father as "a tiny little man" whom he could pick up with one hand and place on the dresser at the age of six. Hagrid clearly felt great affection for him; in Harry Potter and the Prisoner of Azkaban, he says that his father’s death when Hagrid was in third year at Hogwarts was one of his saddest memories.

Hagrid's pets
Hagrid keeps and has kept a variety of pets, including some which the Wizarding community considers impossible to domesticate. They are not always wrong. Rowling has said that Hagrid has little interest in tamer magical creatures because of the lack of a challenge, although he has a large but cowardly boarhound named Fang. Hagrid’s love of dangerous magical creatures is central to the plot of several books of the series.

Aragog

Aragog was an Acromantula, an enormous, sentient spider capable of speech, who made a unique clicking noise as he moved in search of prey. Hagrid raised Aragog from an egg as a Hogwarts student, keeping him inside a cupboard. In his third year at Hogwarts, Hagrid was caught talking to Aragog in the dungeons by Tom Riddle, who alleged that Aragog was the "Monster of Slytherin", and that Hagrid had opened the Chamber of Secrets. In fact, it was Riddle who had opened the Chamber, and the monster was actually a basilisk.

After Hagrid's expulsion and assignment as gamekeeper, Aragog lived in the Forbidden Forest. Hagrid found him a mate, Mosag, with whom Aragog bore an entire colony of giant spiders. He remained grateful to Hagrid for his entire life, and kept his carnivorous children from attacking him when he came to visit (to bring him and his family food). This courtesy was not extended to other creatures and people, even when they were friends of Hagrid's; he allowed his children to attack Harry, Ron, and Fang when they encountered him in Harry Potter and the Chamber of Secrets. Hagrid led Harry and Ron to Aragog by giving them the cryptic advice, "follow the spiders". An aging Aragog reveals to Harry and Ron Hagrid's innocence and the discovery of a girl's corpse in the bathroom, before giving them a clue of the Chamber's resident monster; it was born in the castle, and his species never speak of the creature nor give its name, despite Hagrid's numerous inquiries, as they fear it above all others. Though Aragog allowed his children to attack Harry, Ron, and Fang, they were saved at the last minute by Ron's father Arthur Weasley's flying Ford Anglia, which had been lost in the forest months before. Aragog remained in the Forbidden Forest for the rest of his life, but eventually died of old age in Harry Potter and the Half-Blood Prince. Hagrid retrieved Aragog’s body from the forest so that he could give him a proper burial, fearing that his children would devour his body. From that point on, the spider colony was the only part of the Forbidden Forest that Hagrid could not enter safely.

Aragog’s children returned in Harry Potter and the Deathly Hallows during the Battle at Hogwarts; having been driven from the forest, they began attacking Death Eaters and Hogwarts' inhabitants indiscriminately. Hagrid’s love of the spiders endangered him and others because he tried to protect them; the spiders thanked Hagrid by capturing him and taking him to Voldemort. It is unknown what happens to them afterwards.

Aragog was voiced by Julian Glover in the film adaptation of the Chamber of Secrets. In 2017, in celebration of the 20th anniversary of "Harry Potter" franchise, arachnologists Anton A. Nadolny and Alireza Zamani named a new species of Iranian wolf spiders (Lycosidae) after Aragog, as Lycosa aragogi. The single specimen was collected on 26 April 2016, just over 19 years after Aragog died (20 April 1997 in the world of the book).

Buckbeak

Buckbeak, along with eleven other hippogriffs, is introduced during one of Hagrid’s Care of Magical Creatures classes. Hagrid explains that hippogriffs are very calm, powerful, proud creatures, but are sensitive and demand respect. Harry successfully approaches Buckbeak, who allows him to ride him around the paddock.

Draco, in an arrogant attempt to show up his school nemesis, endeavours to approach Buckbeak as well. It becomes obvious that Draco neither listens to nor cares about Hagrid's warnings about the hippogriffs' sensitivity, as he makes contemptuous remarks about Buckbeak. Quickly angered, Buckbeak slashes Draco’s arm with his claws. Pretending to be injured much more severely than he truly is, Draco persuades his father, Lucius Malfoy, to use his political power to sentence Buckbeak to death. Hagrid’s numerous appeals fail, and members of the Committee for the Disposal of Dangerous Creatures come to Hogwarts to execute Buckbeak. With the use of a Time-Turner, Hermione and Harry free Buckbeak (they believed him earlier to have been executed, but it was revealed the executioner only swung his axe into the fence in anger; in the film he does this to a pumpkin) and rescue Sirius from the tower in which he is being held before being handed over to the Dementors. Sirius escapes with Buckbeak and flies to safety. During most of Harry’s fourth year, Sirius and Buckbeak hide in a cave in the mountains above Hogsmeade. After this, they move to Number 12 Grimmauld Place, whereupon Buckbeak stays in Sirius' mother’s former room. When Kreacher wants to lure Sirius away briefly, he wounds Buckbeak.

In Half-Blood Prince, Harry inherits Buckbeak, and allows Hagrid to look after him again. To avoid suspicion from the Ministry of Magic, he is given the alias "Witherwings". A fiercely loyal creature, Buckbeak chases Severus Snape away from Harry by slashing his claws at the end of the book. Buckbeak also features in the Battle of Hogwarts at the end of the Deathly Hallows leading the Hogwarts Thestrals against Voldemort’s giants.

Fang
Fang is a large boarhound (portrayed in the films by a Neapolitan Mastiff) that, aside from his enormous size, appears to be an entirely ordinary dog. While Fang's appearance is intimidating, he is, in Hagrid's words, "a bloody coward." Boisterous and loving with people he knows, he seems to enjoy licking Harry, Ron, or Hermione around the face or ears.

In the Philosopher’s Stone he accompanies Harry, Hagrid, Draco, and Hermione into the Forbidden Forest to look for an injured unicorn. In the following book, the Chamber of Secrets, Harry and Ron take Fang into the forest where he is scared stiff of both the gigantic acromantula and Mr Weasley’s flying car. In Harry Potter and the Half-Blood Prince, an escaping Death Eater sets fire to Hagrid’s hut while Fang is inside; Hagrid enters the flaming hut, slings Fang over his shoulder, and carries him to safety. In Harry Potter and the Deathly Hallows, Fang and Hagrid participate in the Battle of Hogwarts; though Fang's exact involvement is not clear. He is last seen running away after a shattered vase frightens him. It's implied that Fang survives, as Hagrid is not seen mourning him at any time. It's unknown if Fang is still alive when Harry's children come to Hogwarts.

Fluffy

Fluffy is a giant three-headed dog provided by Hagrid to guard the trapdoor leading to the underground chamber where the Philosopher's Stone was hidden until the end of Philosopher's Stone. The only known way to get past Fluffy is to lull him to sleep by playing music. Fluffy is based on Cerberus, the three-headed dog from Greek mythology that guards the gates to the underworld. As with Fluffy, Cerberus was lulled to sleep with music by Orpheus.

In Philosopher's Stone, Harry, Ron, Hermione and Neville accidentally run into Fluffy whilst hiding from Peeves, who was attempting to give them away to caretaker Argus Filch, who was searching for them. On Halloween, Harry and Ron witness Snape entering the door to Fluffy's chamber, and for the next few days having a pronounced limp. Harry also overhears him saying "How are you meant to keep your eyes on all three heads at once?" to Filch. However, it is later revealed that he followed then Hogwarts Defence Against the Dark Arts professor Quirinus Quirrell into the chamber. While Fluffy is guarding the Philosopher's Stone, Professor Quirrell penetrates Fluffy's defences by playing a harp, in order to access the trapdoor, while Harry uses a flute that Hagrid had given to him.

J. K. Rowling later revealed that Dumbledore had repatriated Fluffy to Greece.

Norbert

Norbert is a Norwegian Ridgeback dragon that Hagrid had acquired as an egg from a mysterious, hooded stranger in the Hog's Head, who turned out to be Professor Quirrell. Hagrid helps the dragon hatch from the egg. Norbert becomes very dangerous and much bigger in the weeks following. Norbert bit Ron’s hand, causing him to require medical treatment due to the venom in her fangs.  Harry, Ron, and Hermione finally persuade Hagrid to send the dragon to Ron’s older brother Charlie, who is studying dragons in Romania. In the Deathly Hallows, Charlie reveals to Hagrid that "Norbert" is actually female and had been renamed Norberta. Charlie adds that female Norwegian Ridgeback dragons "are more vicious..." which explained Norbert's biting and dangerous behaviour as a baby.

Reception
IGN listed Hagrid as their thirteenth top Harry Potter character, saying that Hagrid had become a surrogate for the audience and that the short scene in the Harry Potter and the Goblet of Fire film where he recollects memorable moments with Harry, Hermione and Ron gave them a "cherished memory". IGN’s Joe Utichi also listed Hagrid as his 7th favourite Harry Potter character.

In popular culture
Hagrid has appeared in various animated and non-animated parodies of Harry Potter. He was featured in US skit comedy Saturday Night Live, portrayed by Horatio Sanz, in the same episode in which Lindsay Lohan played Hermione; Bobby Moynihan later portrayed Hagrid in 2012, when Daniel Radcliffe hosted the show. In Alistair McGowan's Big Impression show, Hagrid appeared in a sketch called "Louis Potter and the Philosopher’s Scone", in which he was portrayed by Robbie Coltrane himself. Hagrid is also parodied in Harry Potter and the Secret Chamberpot of Azerbaijan, a story released by Comic Relief in 2003, and he was played by Ronnie Corbett. In the Potter Puppet Pals parodies by Neil Cicierega, Hagrid appeared in the episode "Ron's Disease", and later in the episode "Neville's Birthday". Hagrid also appears in the parody stage production Harry Potter and the Obnoxious Voice, interacting with Draco Malfoy and a dementor. In one episode of the second series of Tracey Ullman's State of the Union, Tracey Ullman parodies Rowling as bossy and very keen on keeping her creations copyrighted, believing a hobo is impersonating Hagrid.

Hagrid makes an appearance in the theme park attraction Harry Potter and the Forbidden Journey at The Wizarding World of Harry Potter in Orlando, Japan and Hollywood. A new rollercoaster, Hagrid's Magical Creatures Motorbike Adventure, opened at Universal Orlando's Islands of Adventure theme park on 13 June 2019, replacing the Dragon Challenge dual roller coasters and is themed around Hagrid and his love for magical creatures.

References

Further reading

External links

 Rubeus Hagrid at Harry Potter Wiki
 Rubeus Hagrid at Harry Potter Lexicon

Harry Potter characters
Literary characters introduced in 1997
Fictional English people
Fictional horticulturists and gardeners
Fictional park rangers
Fictional half-giants
Fictional schoolteachers
Male characters in film
Male characters in literature
Fictional biologists